Mary Knight may refer to:

 Mary Ann Knight (1776–1851), English painter
 Mary M. Knight (1854–1940), Washington state pioneer and educator
 Mary Knight (singer) (1631–?), English singer and poet

See also
 May Night, an 1880 Russian comic opera
 Mary Nighy (born 1984), English actress and filmmaker